Jens Oliver Zimmermann (born 6 August 1972 in Freudenstadt, West Germany) is a German sport announcer, moderator and athletes manager. He had started his career as a press speaker of popular German football team Stuttgarter Kickers. Nowadays he executes announcing of sport competitions in Germany as well as abroad. Jens Zimmermann is the first and only German announcer, who featured 2010 Vancouver Olympic Games and 2014 Sochi Olympic Games.

Life and career

Early career
Starting his career in 1997 as a press speaker of Stuttgarter Kickers, he developed his career to Managing Director at the same football club, where he held this position from 2009 until 2011. In 2011 he ran self-founded company "Marketing-Moderation Zimmermann", where he officially started the field of athlete management. In 2014, among the expansion of business, the new agency "24passion" is created. "24passion" executes the full-cycle Sport Production (audio-/visual support of the sport events), athlete management (Marcel Nguyen, Frank Stäbler, Anna Seidel, Johannes Rydzek, Manuel Faisst, Andreas Toba, Elisabeth Seitz, Sebastian Bradatsch, Luis Brethauer, Daniel Bohnacker, Aline Focken and the German handball players Felix Koenig and Marcel Schiller) and marketing solutions for business.

Overall experience

As the announcer Jens Zimmermann has announced more than 500 events overall in German as well as in English languages. His professional career includes sport world's top competitions like Olympic Games, Four Hills Tournament in Oberstdorf, Nordic Ski World Championships, Handball World Championships 2007, Mercedes-Benz Junior Football Cup (annually since 2001) and more than 60 handball games of German League.

References

External links

 Jens Zimmermann's Official Website
 New York Times: Translating Thrills on the Skiing Trails
 Interview with Jens Zimmermann by Stuttgarter Zeitung Newspaper (in German)

1972 births
Living people
Sportspeople from Stuttgart
Public address announcers
German sports broadcasters
Radio and television announcers
German sports agents
German sports businesspeople
Sports commentators
Gymnastics broadcasters
Olympic Games broadcasters
Skiing announcers